Holcomb USD 363 is a public unified school district headquartered in Holcomb, Kansas, United States.  The district includes the community of Holcomb and nearby rural areas.

History
Effective July 1, 2018 Scott Myers became the superintendent. He was previously a superintendent of other districts and an employee of the Kansas State Department of Education.

In 2018 the leadership of Holcomb USD considered the construction of an indoor pool but decided against it.

The school district historically owned an apartment building.

Schools
The school district operates the following schools:
 Holcomb High School
 Holcomb Middle School
 Holcomb Elementary School
 Wiley Elementary School

See also
 Kansas State Department of Education
 Kansas State High School Activities Association
 List of high schools in Kansas
 List of unified school districts in Kansas

References

External links
 

School districts in Kansas
Education in Finney County, Kansas